Kechallyar (also, Aul Kochalyar and Kachalar) is a village in the Khizi Rayon of Azerbaijan.

References 

Populated places in Khizi District